Cadiz is a village in and the county seat of  Harrison County, Ohio, United States, located about 20 miles southwest of Steubenville. The population was 3,051 at the 2020 census.

History

Cadiz was founded in 1803 at the junction of westward roads from Pittsburgh and Washington, Pennsylvania, and named after Cádiz, Spain. The town became the county seat of newly formed Harrison County in 1813. By 1840, Cadiz had 1,028 residents; by 1846, the town had four churches and 21 stores. The Steubenville and Indiana Railroad, a predecessor of the Pennsylvania Railroad, opened to Cadiz June 11, 1854.

In the early and mid nineteenth century, several local families operated stations and served as conductors in the Underground Railroad, helping runaway slaves escape to Canada.

By 1880 population had nearly doubled and the town had three newspapers and three banks.

Early industry was based on agriculture and processing farm products. In 1889, a brief oil boom began with the shipment of 120 barrels of oil produced in nearby Green Township. Coal mining, both underground and surface, became the prominent industry through most of the twentieth century. More recently the development of the Marcellus Shale in the surrounding area has made Cadiz a center for natural gas production. The MarkWest Complex, opened in 2012, processes more than 180 million cubic feet of natural gas per day for shipment via pipeline to Mont Belvieu, Texas.

Geography

Climate

Demographics

2010 census
As of the US Census of 2010, there were 3,353 people, 1,415 households, and 920 families living in the village. The population density was 376.7 people per square mile (145.2/km). There were 1,590 housing units at an average density of 178.6 per square mile (68.8 km). The racial makeup of the village was 87.4% White, 8.4% African American, 0.3% Asian, 0.3% from other races, and 3.5% from two or more races. Hispanic or Latino of any race were 0.8% of the population.

Of the 1,415 households, 29.8% had children under the age of 18 living with them, 44.8% were married couples living together, 14.8% had a female householder with no husband present, and 35.0% were non-families. 30.7% of households were one person and 12.9% were one person aged 65 or older. The average household size was 2.32 and the average family size was 2.86. 39.1% of households were renters and 60.9% were home owners. Families made up 73.3% of all home owners and 52.1% of all renters.

The age distribution was 24.8% under the age of 20, 22.9% from 20 to 40, 27.2% from 40 to 60, 19.3% from 60 to 80, and 5.9% who were 80 years of age or older. The median age was 42.3 years. For every 100 females there were 89.3 males. For every 100 females age 18 and over, there were 84.8 males.

According to 2006-2010 American Community Survey 5-Year Estimates by the US Census Bureau, The median household income was $31,092, and the median family income  was $43,182. Males had a median income of $35,934 versus $26,726 for females. The per capita income for the village was $18,002. About 14.0% of families and 19.0% of the population were below the poverty line, including 26.7% of those under age 18 and 15.0% of those age 65 or over.

2000 census
At the 2000 census there were 3,308 people, 1,391 households, and 916 families living in the village. The population density was 374.5 people per square mile (144.6/km). There were 1,524 housing units at an average density of 172.5 per square mile (66.6/km).  The racial makeup of the village was 87.70% White, 8.98% African American, 0.39% Asian, 0.03% Pacific Islander, 0.15% from other races, and 2.75% from two or more races. Hispanic or Latino of any race were 0.27%.

Of the 1,391 households 28.3% had children under the age of 18 living with them, 49.2% were married couples living together, 13.3% had a female householder with no husband present, and 34.1% were non-families. 30.9% of households were one person and 16.0% were one person aged 65 or older. The average household size was 2.30 and the average family size was 2.85.

The age distribution was 22.3% under the age of 18, 7.5% from 18 to 24, 23.6% from 25 to 44, 25.6% from 45 to 64, and 20.9% 65 or older. The median age was 43 years. For every 100 females there were 82.3 males. For every 100 females age 18 and over, there were 77.4 males.

The median household income was $29,518 and the median family income  was $42,049. Males had a median income of $33,233 versus $17,192 for females. The per capita income for the village was $17,405. About 12.5% of families and 15.7% of the population were below the poverty line, including 24.2% of those under age 18 and 8.9% of those age 65 or over.

Education
The village is served by Harrison Hills City School District, which operates two elementary schools and Harrison Central High School.

Cadiz has a public library, a branch of the Puskarich Public Library.

In the fall 2015, a levy was passed to build a new preK-12 school building. The 4.98 million dollar levy for the creation of a 190,000-square-foot school complex will be able to house 1,550 students. Ground broke on the new building in August 2017, and is predicted to open in the fall of 2019.

Notable people
 Rupert R. Beetham, speaker of Ohio House of Representatives
 John Bingham, Republican congressman
 Henderson H. Carson, U.S. representative from Ohio
 Thomas Valentine Cooper, Pennsylvania state senator and representative
 Robert Crozier, senator from Kansas
 Charles S. Dewey, U.S. representative from Illinois
 Ernest G. Eagleson, two-term mayor of Boise, Idaho
 Clark Gable, actor
 David Hollingsworth, U.S. representative from Ohio
 William Henry Holmes, scientist and artist
 Daniel Kilgore, U.S. representative from Ohio
 Humphrey H. Leavitt, U.S. representative from Ohio and U.S. district court judge
 Francis J. Love, U.S. representative from West Virginia
 Tyria Moore, companion of female serial killer Aileen Wuornos
 John F. Oglevee, member of the Ohio House of Representatives and Ohio state auditor
 Orlando Henderson Petty, Medal of Honor recipient
 William R. Sapp, U.S. representative from Ohio
 William E. Slemmons, clergyman and academic
 Matthew Simpson, bishop of the Methodist Episcopal Church
 David P. Thompson, businessman and politician
 Thomas Tipton, U.S. senator
 Ben Wilson, football coach
 Oriska Worden, singer and vaudeville performer
 Elizabeth Russel, missionary educator

References

External links

 Village of Cadiz
Harrison Community Hospital
 Harrison Hills City School District

Villages in Harrison County, Ohio
Villages in Ohio
County seats in Ohio
Spanish-American culture in Ohio
1803 establishments in Ohio